Brandon Joseph Nazione (born March 31, 1994) is an American-Italian professional basketball player.

College career
Nazione played college basketball for Des Moines Area Community College and Eastern Michigan University.

Professional career
In 2016, Nazione signed with Bayer Giants Leverkusen. The following season he signed with Gimnasia y Esgrima in Argentina.

Nazione played for Sporting CP in the first half of the 2019–2020 season.

In January 2021, Nazione signed in Iceland with Úrvalsdeild karla club KR.

References

External links
 Profile at Eurobasket.com

1994 births
Living people
American expatriate basketball people in Argentina
American expatriate basketball people in Germany
American expatriate basketball people in Iceland
American expatriate basketball people in Portugal
American expatriate basketball people in Uruguay
American men's basketball players
Basketball players from Michigan
Centers (basketball)
Eastern Michigan Eagles men's basketball players
KR men's basketball players
Sporting CP basketball players
Úrvalsdeild karla (basketball) players